Andrew Charles Kent (born 1969) is the bass player for Australian rock band You Am I.

Biography
Andy Kent was born  in Wellington, New Zealand. He joined You Am I in late 1991. At the age of twenty-two, he replaced Nick Tischler, and joined Tim Rogers with new drummer Mark Tunaley (who had replaced Rogers' brother Jaimme). Kent was the band's live sound engineer prior to being asked to join the band at a performance in Canberra. Kent's first recorded appearance with the band was on their Goddamn EP in 1992. Tuanaley later left the band after the release of their first album, Sound As Ever, and was replaced by Rusty Hopkinson.

During the band commentary on The Cream and the Crock DVD, Tim and Andy mention that Kent was originally going to be the guitarist in You Am I, because of his level of proficiency. Ultimately he became the bass player.

In 2002, Kent took over the management of You Am I. He also runs concert promoting company Love Police Touring and independent record label, Love Police Records & Tapes.

Kent has also played bass for The Vines on their 2006 studio album, Vision Valley.

At the fourth annual Jack Awards in 2007, Kent won 'The Ian Rilen Best Bass Guitarist' award.

References

General
  Note: Archived [on-line] copy has limited functionality.
  Note: [on-line] version established at White Room Electronic Publishing Pty Ltd in 2007 and was expanded from the 2002 edition.

Specific

External links
 You Am I official website

1969 births
Living people
Australian rock bass guitarists
Male bass guitarists
People from Wellington City
You Am I members
Australian male guitarists